Salina beta is a species of elongate-bodied springtail in the family Paronellidae.

References

Collembola
Articles created by Qbugbot
Animals described in 1980